Ek Kali Muskayee is a 1968 Bollywood drama film starring Ashok Kumar, Joy Mukherjee and Meera Joglekar in the lead roles. The music album was composed by maestro Madan Mohan while songs like "Na Tum Bewafa Ho"  by Lata Mangeshkar. Also title song 'Lo Ek Kali Muskayi' and 'Zulf Bikhrati Chali Aayee Ho' both by Mohammed Rafi were very popular.

Cast
Ashok Kumar as Choudhary Sahib
Joy Mukherjee as Dr. Dilip
Meera Joglekar as Meena
Lalita Pawar as Mrs. Bala
Malika as Putli
Nirupa Roy as Hostel Principal 
 Mehmood as Munna
 Om Prakash as Lala 
 Nana Palsikar as Ram Ratan

Soundtrack

References

External links
 

1968 films
1960s Hindi-language films
Films scored by Madan Mohan